is a Japanese bobsledder. He competed in the four man event at the 1972 Winter Olympics.

References

1948 births
Living people
Japanese male bobsledders
Olympic bobsledders of Japan
Bobsledders at the 1972 Winter Olympics
Sportspeople from Hokkaido